A Bo+Bo (UK usage) is a locomotive with two four-wheeled bogies with articulated connection between them and with all axles powered by individual traction motors.

Typical Bo+Bo locomotives include the South African Class 1E and South African Class 2E.

References

Bo+Bo